Michael E. Lesk (born 1945) is an American computer scientist.

Biography
In the 1960s, Michael Lesk worked for the SMART Information Retrieval System project, wrote much of its retrieval code and did many of the retrieval experiments, as well as obtaining a BA degree in Physics and Chemistry from Harvard College in 1964 and a PhD from Harvard University in Chemical Physics in 1969.

From 1970 to 1984, Lesk worked at Bell Labs in the group that built Unix. Lesk wrote Unix tools for word processing (tbl, refer, and the standard ms macro package, all for troff), for compiling (Lex), and for networking (uucp). He also wrote the Portable I/O Library (the predecessor to stdio.h in C) and contributed significantly to the development of the C language preprocessor.

In 1984, he left to work for Bellcore, where he managed the computer science research group. There, Lesk worked on specific information systems applications, mostly with geography (a system for driving directions) and dictionaries (a system for disambiguating words in context).
In the 1990s, Lesk worked on a large chemical information system, the CORE project, with Cornell, Online Computer Library Center, American Chemical Society, and Chemical Abstracts Service.
From 1998 to 2002, Lesk headed the National Science Foundation's Division of Information and Intelligent Systems, where he oversaw Phase 2 of the NSF's Digital Library Initiative.
Currently, he is a professor on the faculty of the Library and Information Science Department, School of Communication & Information, Rutgers University.

Lesk received the Flame award for lifetime achievement from Usenix in 1994, is a Fellow of the ACM in 1996, and in 2005 was elected to the National Academy of Engineering. He has authored a number of books.

See also
 Lesk algorithm

Bibliography
Selected books by Michael Lesk:
 Practical Digital Libraries: Books, Bytes, and Bucks, 1997. .
 Understanding Digital Libraries, 2nd ed., December 2004. .

References

External links
 Michael Lesk personal website
 

1945 births
Living people
Harvard College alumni
American computer programmers
Scientists at Bell Labs
Rutgers University faculty
Unix people
Members of the United States National Academy of Engineering
Fellows of the Association for Computing Machinery
Troff
Computational linguistics researchers
Data miners